A referendum on the new Constitution of France was held in Moyen-Congo on 28 September 1958 as part of a wider referendum held across the French Union. The new constitution would make the territory an autonomous republic within the French Community, and was approved by 99% of voters. The Territorial Assembly proclaimed the Republic of the Congo on 28 November 1958, and the country became independent two years later.

Results

References

1958 in the Republic of the Congo
Referendums in the Republic of the Congo
1958 referendums
September 1958 events in Africa
Constitutional referendums